Alexander Dobrindt  (born 7 June 1970) is a German politician of the Christian Social Union of Bavaria (CSU). Between 2013 and 2017, he served as Federal Minister of Transport and Digital Infrastructure in the government of Chancellor Angela Merkel. Previously, he was the Secretary General of the Christian Social Union of Bavaria under the leadership of party chairman Horst Seehofer from 2009.

Early life
Dobrindt was born in Peißenberg, Bavaria. He graduated from the Weilheim Highschool in 1989 and continued his studies in the Ludwig Maximilian University of Munich finishing with a Master of Arts in Sociology in 1995.

After obtaining his degree, Dobrindt worked at an engineering company as a Financial Director from 1996 to 2001 and as a Managing Director from 2001 to 2005.

Political career
Dobrindt joined the Junge Union (Junior party of the C.S.U.) in 1986 and 4 years later the Christian Social Union of Bavaria.
He has been a member of the German National Parliament (Bundestag) since the 2002 federal elections when he won the direct mandate in the Parliamentary Constituency of Weilheim with 59.4 percent of the votes. Since 2009, he serves as the District-Chairman of the CSU in Weilheim-Schongau.

In parliament, Dobrindt served as a member of the Committee on Economic Affairs and Technology between 2005 and 2009. In the negotiations to form a coalition government following the 2013 elections, he was part of the 15-member leadership circle chaired by Merkel, Seehofer and Sigmar Gabriel.

In his capacity as minister, Dobrindt introduced a controversial road toll which forces foreign car drivers to pay up to 130 euros a year for using Germany's Autobahn motorways; the toll was a pet project of his CSU party. He was also in charge of drafting the government's plan to spend almost 270 billion euros (£226.48 billion) to repair and build new roads, railway lines and waterways between 2017 and 2030.

From late 2016, Dobrindt was a member of the German government's cabinet committee on Brexit at which ministers discuss organizational and structural issues related to the United Kingdom's departure from the European Union.

Following the 2017 elections, Dobrindt succeeded Gerda Hasselfeldt as head of the Bundestag group of CSU parliamentarians. He has since led the joint CDU/CSU group with his co-chair from the CDU, Volker Kauder.

Other activities

Corporate boards
 KfW, Ex-Officio Member of the Supervisory Board (2014-2017)

Non-profit organizations
 ZDF, Member of the Television Board (2009-2014)
 Akademie für Politische Bildung Tutzing, Member of the Advisory Board
 Deutsches Museum, Member of the Board of Trustees

Political positions
In 2013, Dobrindt called LGBT people a "shrill minority" which adopted an odd lifestyle. In June 2017, he voted against Germany's introduction of same-sex marriage.

Personal life
Dobrindt is a Roman Catholic, was married in Torri del Benaco, Italy in 2009, and has one son.

See also
 List of Bavarian Christian Social Union politicians
 Christian Social Union of Bavaria

References

External links

Official Website of M.P. Alexander Dobrindt 
M.P.Alexander Dobrindt in the Official Website of the German Parliament 
Interview of M.P. Alexander Dobrindt in Abendblatt 

1970 births
Living people
Transport ministers of Germany
Communications ministers
People from Weilheim-Schongau
German Roman Catholics
Members of the Bundestag for Bavaria
Members of the Bundestag 2021–2025
Members of the Bundestag 2017–2021
Members of the Bundestag 2013–2017
Members of the Bundestag 2009–2013
Members of the Bundestag 2005–2009
Members of the Bundestag 2002–2005
Members of the Bundestag for the Christian Social Union in Bavaria